Swinton railway station is a railway station in Swinton, South Yorkshire, England.  It has three platforms and a small bus station, and lies at the junction of the former North Midland Railway main line between Rotherham Masborough and Leeds via Cudworth and the former South Yorkshire Railway line to Doncaster.

History 
There have been three stations on the North Midland Railway line at Swinton, the first of which, opened in 1840, built by the N.M.R. occupied the site of the present station, goods facilities occupying what is now the car park. This was replaced by a second station north of the present site, on the opposite side of the road bridge, built by the Midland Railway. This station became known as Swinton Town to distinguish it from Swinton Central on the former Manchester, Sheffield and Lincolnshire Railway line. It was served by stopping trains from Sheffield Midland to York and to Leeds City via Cudworth.  The station closed in January 1968 with the rationalisation of local rail services in South Yorkshire. The original station buildings still remain at street level and are used for light industry.

Redevelopment and rebuilding 
By the late 1980s it was realised that South Yorkshire railways had been cut back too far in the 1960s; in particular, Swinton/Wath-upon-Dearne/Kilnhurst lacked a station.  The South Yorkshire Passenger Transport Authority put forward a four-year plan for the improvement of services and stations as part of their Rail Development Plan, this leading to the re-instatement of the "Swinton Curve", from the former North Midland Railway at Swinton to the former South Yorkshire Railway at Mexborough West Junction, the building of a new station at Swinton and the re-routing of all passenger trains via this route. Immediately after reopening by British Rail in 1990 it was unstaffed, but increased passenger usage led to the establishment in the 1990s of initially a small cabin staffed for the morning peak period only. The cabin later was replaced by a brick building for the ticket office, waiting room and toilet. It is also an interchange for local bus services to Wath and Manvers.

The ticket office is staffed on Mondays to Saturday between 07:00 and 13:30.  Outside these hours, passengers can buy tickets (or a permit to travel) from a ticket vending machine near the station entrance (card payments only).  Shelters and passenger information screens are located on each platform, with a fully accessible footbridge linking the ticket hall with platforms 2 and 3.

Services
The station has a similar service level to neighbouring Rotherham Central, namely two trains per hour to Doncaster (one extending to Adwick), one per hour to Leeds via Moorthorpe and three per hour to Sheffield. The thrice-daily Dearne Valley local service to York also calls. The station sits on the main North East - South West corridor which means various express services and freight trains pass through.

Sundays have an hourly services to Doncaster and Leeds, two trains to York and two trains per hour to Sheffield.

Services are generally formed of Northern Trains Class 150, Class 158 and Class 195 DMUs.

Upon the May 2018 timetable change, Swinton no longer has direct trains to Scunthorpe or Lincoln, and the two TransPennine Express services that previously called here now pass through non-stop. The Hull stopping trains also ceased at the winter 2019 timetable change, so passengers now have to change at Doncaster for onward connections.

References

External links

Swinton, South Yorkshire
DfT Category E stations
Railway stations in Rotherham
Railway stations opened by British Rail
Railway stations in Great Britain opened in 1990
Reopened railway stations in Great Britain
Northern franchise railway stations